Lieb may refer to:

As a surname
 R. Eric Lieb, American writer and book editor
 Eli Lieb (born 1979), American singer and songwriter 
 Elliott H. Lieb (born 1932), American mathematical physicist and professor of mathematics
 Ernst Lieb, American business executive
 Fred Lieb (1888–1980), American sportswriter and baseball historian
 Oliver Lieb (born 1969), German electronic music producer and DJ
 Marc Lieb (born 1980), German motor-racing driver

Other uses
 Lieb is a character from The Lingo Show, a kids' TV show.

See also
 Mihály Munkácsy (1844–1900), Hungarian painter, born Michael von Lieb
 Liebe, a surname
 Leeb, a surname
 

Surnames from nicknames